SRD may refer to:

Sardinian language's ISO 639 code
Serenissimus Rudolfus Dux, a title of Archduke Rudolf of Austria
Services Reconnaissance Department, an Australian WWII agency
Short-range device for radio communication
Sports Radio Detroit
SR-D, a Dolby technology
Stapleton Road railway station's station code
Step recovery diode
Surinamese dollar by ISO 4217 currency code
System Reference Document in role-playing games
Systems Research & Development, a Nintendo subsidiary
 Srđ, a mountain in Dalmatia, Croatia